Brice Weeks Armstrong Jr (January 3, 1936 – January 10, 2020) was an American voice actor and announcer who primarily worked on the properties of Funimation. He was best known as the original narrator of Dragon Ball Z. He was also known for being the voice of Miss Etta Kette in Barney & Friends.

Filmography

Anime
 Baki the Grappler - Igari Kanji
 Basilisk: The Kōga Ninja Scrolls - Tokugawa Ieyasu
 Blue Gender - Chairman Victor
 Burst Angel - Chief Katsu
 Case Closed - Einstein Achurbee, Gregor, Nick Weldon, Robert Gilmore, Shane O’Connor, Theodore Kinsella, others
 Dragon Ball - Narrator
 Dragon Ball Z - Ginyu (Remastered)
 Dragon Ball Z: Lord Slug - Slug

 Fruits Basket - Tohru's Grandfather
 Fullmetal Alchemist - Tim Marcoh
 The Galaxy Railways - Whitman (Ep. 8)
 Lupin the 3rd - Various (Movies & Specials) (FUNimation dub)
 Samurai 7 - Masamune
 Spiral: The Bonds of Reasoning - Raizou Shiranagatani
 Yu Yu Hakusho - Mr. Takanaka, Master Mitamura, Topaz/Kougyoku, Kuroda

Video games
Half-Life: Decay (2001) - Richard Keller, HECU Soldiers
BloodRayne 2 (2004) - Kagan Elite

Orders
 Barney & Friends - Miss Etta Kette
 It's Time for Counting! - Beauregard

Death
Brice Armstrong died on January 10, 2020, a week after his 84th birthday. He was survived by 6 children and 9 grandchildren.

References

External links
 
 

1936 births
2020 deaths
American male voice actors
Place of death missing
Male actors from Dallas